Nipo may refer to:

People
 Nipo T. Strongheart (1891–1966), American lecturer

Places
 , Norway
 , Norway

Organisations
 NIPO
 TNS Nipo

See also
 Nipo-peruano, Peruvian citizens of Japanese origin or ancestry